Sidi Ifni Airport  is an airport serving Sidi Ifni, a city in the Guelmim-Oued Noun region in Morocco.

Airlines and destinations
The airport is not open for any commercial flights. It is closed due to the runway being in bad conditions.

Facilities

References

External links
 
 

Airports in Morocco
Defunct airports in Morocco
Buildings and structures in Guelmim-Oued Noun